Geshur (lit. Bridging) is an Israeli settlement organized as a kibbutz on the ridge of the southern Golan Heights. The international community considers Israeli settlements in the Golan Heights illegal under international law, but the Israeli government disputes this.

Etymology
The kibbutz is named after a biblical kingdom which may or may not have been in the same area.

History

Bronze age

According to the Bible, during the time of King David, Geshur was an independent kingdom. David married Maachah, a daughter of Talmai, King of Geshur. Her son Absalom fled to his mother's native country, after the murder of his half-brother and David's eldest son, Amnon. Absalom stayed there for three years before being rehabilitated by David. (ib.) Geshur managed to maintain its independence from the Aramean kingdoms until after the time of King Solomon.

Modern period
Kibbutz Geshur was founded in 1971 by Hashomer Hatzair, a socialist-Zionist youth movement, The village was established to the south of the Syrian village of Al-Adaisa, which was depopulated and razed, after being occupied by Israel in 1967. The first Golan Heights vineyards were planted in Geshur in 1976.

References

Further reading
Duel for the Golan: the 100-hour battle that saved Israel, Jerry Asher, Eric M. Hammel, W. Morrow, 1987 
Zohar, Mattanyahu, "The Land of Geshur Project: Regional Archaeology of the Southern Golan (1987-1988 season)", Israel Exploration Journal, Volume 39, Israel Exploration Society, 1989

External links
Drunk with Success

Israeli settlements in the Golan Heights
Kibbutzim
Kibbutz Movement
Golan Regional Council
Populated places established in 1971
Populated places in Northern District (Israel)
1971 establishments in the Israeli Military Governorate